Gundlupet also known as Land of Tigers (Gundlupētē in Kannada) is a municipal town situated in the Chamarajanagar district of Karnataka, India. It is also known as "The flower pot of India". It is situated 60 km away from NH 766 and approximately 200 km from the state administrative capital, Bangalore. Gundlupet is the last town in Karnataka on the National Highway 766 which goes through Mysore, Ooty, Wayanad, and Calicut. It is situated very close to the Tamil Nadu and Kerala state borders. NH 181 begins from Gundlupet and ends in Nagapattinam in Tamil Nadu via Ooty and Coimbatore.

The Bandipur National Park is situated 17 km away from Gundlupet. Gundlupet was previously known as Vijayapura, named after the ancient Vijayanarayana Temple.

Geography 
It has an average elevation of 816 metres (2,677 feet).

Demographics

Religion-wise Population - Gundlupet Taluka

Agriculture 

The main crops grown are jowar, ragi, sugar cane, turmeric, onion and banana. It is a fairly dry region on the rain-shadow side of the Western Ghats, with an average annual rainfall of about 60 cm. Almost all of the rainfall is during the monsoon months of July through October. The area's vegetation is dry thorn forest, which can be seen in the nearby reserve forests on the boundary of Bandipur National Park.

Notable attractions and sites nearby

1. Himavad Gopalaswamy hills, 20 km from Gundlupet

2. Bandipur National Park, 24 km from Gundlupet 

3, Hulugan Muradi Venkataramana betta, 26 km from Gundlupet

4. Parvati, 10 km from Gundlupet

5. Terakanambi and Triyambakpura temples, 12 km from Gundlupet

6. Narasamangala Shiva temple, 7 km from Terakanambi

7. Manchalli Cave temple, 12 km from Gundlupet

8. Pada Guru Lingayat Math (or Adavi Math Padagur), 11km from Gundlupet

9. Yeri Uur Bisilu Bassapa temple

10. Shri Sharana Basaveshwara temple in Bommanahalli, 22 km from Gundlupet

11. Gavi Siddeshvara cave Manchalli, 14 km from Gundlupet

Image gallery

References 

 Cities and towns in Chamarajanagar district